UDP-N-acetylglucosamine 2-epimerase (hydrolysing) (UDP-N-acetylglucosamine 2-epimerase, GNE (gene), siaA (gene), neuC (gene)) is an enzyme with systematic name UDP-N-acetyl-alpha-D-glucosamine hydrolase (2-epimerising). This enzyme catalyses the following chemical reaction

 UDP-N-acetyl-alpha-D-glucosamine + H2O  N-acetyl-D-mannosamine + UDP

The enzyme is found in mammalian liver, as well as in some pathogenic bacteria including Neisseria meningitidis and Staphylococcus aureus.

References

External links 
 

EC 3.2.1